Bandar-e Band-e Moallem (also Romanized as Bandar-e Band-e Mo‘allem; also known as Band-e Mavālīm, Band-e Mo‘allem, Band-i-Mu‘allim, and Band Mo‘allem) is a village in Howmeh Rural District, in the Central District of Bandar Lengeh County, Hormozgan Province, Iran. At the 2006 census, its population was 1,086, in 234 families.

References 

Populated places in Bandar Lengeh County